Nur Hawa "Wawa" Zainal Abidin (born 12 March 1991) is a Malaysian actress and model. She is best known for playing Bunga in the drama series Ana Lu'lu.

Early life and career 
Wawa is the eighth of eleven children, born to a hybrid Filipino-Malaysian family. Her father is a Bruneian mix with Bajau, while her mother is a Filipino. Wawa attended school at St. Dominic.

Before entering the world of acting, Wawa first went into modelling industry at the age of 12. Following a short career as a model, Wawa began work as an actress for Metrowealth (MIG), and has starred in a variety of movies and dramas produced by the company. Wawa's first role as an actor was in the film Sumpahan Kum Kum directed by Ismail Bob Hisham.

Filmography

Film

Television series

Telemovie

Television

Awards and nominations

References

External links 
 

1991 births
Living people
Bajau people
People from Sabah
Malaysian people of Malay descent
Malaysian people of Bruneian descent
Malaysian people of Filipino descent
Malaysian television actresses
Malaysian television personalities
Malaysian female models
21st-century Malaysian actresses
Suluk people